St. Croix, or St. Croix Shop, is an independently owned speciality boutique store selling handmade high-end knitwear founded in Minnesota, USA.

History 

Founded by a group of seven designers 50 years ago, St. Croix began as a small apparel business in Minnesota. However it has become a major retailer in luxury knitwear.

St. Croix Shops joined the advisory board for the Global Point of Sale and Store Operations Summit in Las Vegas in 2004, an event for successful retailers to discuss marketing strategies and modern trends and fashions.

Operations 

St. Croix uses many rare raw materials including Australian Merino Wool, Pima cotton, Tasmanian Lambswool, Cashmere, Vicuna, and Chenille.

St. Croix employs more than 200 craftsmen who hand-craft the item and create limited quantities of each design.
	
There are currently fifteen St. Croix Shops located throughout the United States in upscale shopping areas. The company's clothing can also be found in over 150 specialty boutiques and stores worldwide.

External links 
 Official site

Clothing brands of the United States